Volleyball at the 2011 Southeast Asian Games was held at the University of Sriwijaya, Palembang, Indonesia. Two events were contested.

Indoor

Men's tournament

Preliminary round

|}

Gold Medal match

Final standing

Women's tournament

Preliminary round

|}

Gold Medal match

Final standing

Medalists

Beach

Medalists

References
Start/Result Lists - Volleyball - Indoor

Volley
Volleyball at the Southeast Asian Games